Wood Mountain is a village in the Canadian province of Saskatchewan within the Rural Municipality of Old Post No. 43 and Census Division No. 3. Its name is derived from the Red River Métis words "montagne de bois" (meaning mountain of wood in French), due to the abundance of poplar trees in the otherwise barren region. Highway 18 and Highway 358 intersect south of the community.

Wood Mountain is known for its annual stampede that has been held every year for more than 120 years.

This village is home to the First Nations administrative office for the band government of the Wood Mountain Lakota First Nation.

History 
Wood Mountain was the terminus of the Fort Ellice-Wood Mountain Trail that was used from 1757 to the 1850s to haul provisions such as pemmican by the Metis and First Nations. The trail was over 400 kilometres long.
It incorporated as a village on March 4, 1930.

Demographics 

Economy and tourism 
Historically, Wood Mountain's economy has relied mainly on the agriculture industry. The community still has strong roots to farming and ranching, but with its location and rich history, tourism has become a main industry. The community has accommodations, such as hotels and bed and breakfasts, a cafe restaurant, pool, library, community hall, churches, museums, campgrounds, and parks.

Local attractions 
 Wood Mountain Regional Park
 Wood Mountain Rodeo & Ranching Museum (located at Wood Mountain Regional Park)
 Wood Mountain Community Pool
 Wood Mountain Post Historic Park

Events 
 Wood Mountain Stampede, oldest continuous annual Rodeo in Canada. It is located at Wood Mountain Regional Park and has run since 1890.
 Wood Mountain Farmers Market

Regional attractions 
 Wood Mountain Hills
 Grasslands National Park
 St. Victor Petroglyphs Provincial Historic Park
 Thomson Lake Regional Park

Notable residents 
 Andrew Suknaski, poet
 Kacy & Clayton, folk-rock group

See also 
 List of communities in Saskatchewan

References

External links 

Villages in Saskatchewan
Old Post No. 43, Saskatchewan
Division No. 3, Saskatchewan
Romanian-Canadian history
North-West Mounted Police
Sitting Bull